George Hidden, also known as George Eden, was the member of the Parliament of England for Great Bedwyn for the parliament of 1558.

References 

Members of Parliament for Great Bedwyn
English MPs 1558